Igor Nikolayevich Salov (born 24 March 1983, in Rostov-on-Don) is a Russian rower. He finished 7th in the men's quadruple sculls at the 2008 Summer Olympics.

References 
 
 

1983 births
Living people
Russian male rowers
Sportspeople from Rostov-on-Don
Olympic rowers of Russia
Rowers at the 2008 Summer Olympics